Gibberula lucia is a species of sea snail, a marine gastropod mollusk, in the family Cystiscidae.

Distribution
This marine species occurs off Cape Verdes.

References

 Jousseaume, F., 1876. - Description de quelques mollusques nouveaux. Bulletin de la Société Zoologique de France 1: 265-273
 Moreno D. 2012. The genus Gibberula (Gastropoda, Cystiscidae) in the Cape Verde Islands with the description of a new species. Iberus, 30(1): 67–83.

External links
 MNHN, Paris: syntype

lucia
Gastropods described in 1877